Sadha Nannu Nadipe is a 2022 Indian Telugu-language romantic comedy film written and directed by Lanka Pratheek Prem Karan. The film stars Lanka Pratheek Prem Karan and Vaishnavi Patwardhan in the lead roles while Nagendra Babu and Ali play supporting roles. The film was released on 24 June 2022.

Cast 
Lanka Pratheek Prem Karan as Michael Jackson "MJ"
Vaishnavi Patwardhan as Samaya Hasini "Saha"
Nagendra Babu as Dr. Sekhar
Ali as Aaditya Bal Chandar Das "ABCD"
Rajeev Kanakala as Dr. Rajeev
Surya as Dr. Sharma
Mahesh Achanta as Billa
Sudarshan as Ranga
Naveen as Ananthu

Release 
The film was theatrically released on 24 June 2022.

Reception 
A critic for Sakshi Post stated "Sadha Ninnu Nadipe is a decent entertainer and a one-time watch". Echoing the same, Aithagoni Raju of Asianet Telugu gave a rating of 2.5 out of 5 and praised Lanka Pratheek Prem Karan's work.

References

External links 
 

2022 films
2022 romantic comedy films
Indian romantic comedy films
2020s Telugu-language films
Films set in Andhra Pradesh
Films shot in Andhra Pradesh
Films shot in Rajahmundry